Ginebis corolla is a species of sea snail, a marine gastropod mollusk in the family Eucyclidae.

Description
The height of the shell attains  50 mm.

Distribution
This species occurs in the South China Sea at a depth of 200 m.

References

External links
 To Encyclopedia of Life
 To World Register of Marine Species
 

corolla
Gastropods described in 1970